"Angelina" is a 1990 song recorded by French band PSY. Written by members Pierre Perez-Vergara, Stéphane Planchon and Yassine Dahbi, this pop song was released in 1991 as the first single from the band's  album Être ange, mon ange, produced by Robert Levy-Provençal and which provided the singles "Mahler de malheur" and "Animal moi" too. Directed by Frédéric Planchon, the music video for "Angelina" shows a model named Maïwenn, also known as Polisse. In France, it was a top ten hit and became PSY's only charting single in the country, making the band a one-hit wonder.

Reception
Although written in French-language, "Angelina" became popular in the Philippines and was released in the country after being parodied multiple times, as the original text was replaced by daring lyrics which describe Angelina as a dirty woman who does not wash her body's intimate parts.

A review in Pan-European magazine Music & Media presented "Angelina" like this: "Three inspired young French men exert
themselves to the utmost, for what must be the most beautiful girl in the world. In the meantime, the song encourages you to
dance your legs off". Expert of the French charts Elia Habib noted the "synthetic and harmonious sound" of the song.

In France, "Angelina" debuted at number 43 on the chart edition of 28 September 1991, then climb every week to reach number nine in its sixth week and stayed in the top 50 for 12 weeks. It entered the European Hot 100 Singles at number 63 on 9 November 1992 and remained for five weeks on the chart, with a peak at number 49 in the second week.

Track listings
 7" single - France, Philippines
 "Angelina" — 4:00
 "Le Baiser..." — 4:40

 12" maxi - France, Philippines
 "Angelina" (RLP mix) — 6:52
 "Angelina" (extended version) — 6:28
 "Angelina" (dub mix) — 3:40

 CD maxi - France
 "Angelina" (single mix) — 4:04
 "Angelina" (acoustic mix) — 3:35
 "Le Baiser..." (single mix) — 4:40
 "Angelina" (extended mix) — 6:28
 "Angelina" (RLP mix) — 6:52

 Cassette - France
 "Angelina" — 4:00
 "Le Baiser..." — 4:40

Personnel
 Arrangement, direction – Pierre Perez-Vergara
 Arrangement, directed, mixing – Stéphane Planchon
 Design – FKGB
 Mixing – JPB ("Le Baiser...")
 Mixing – Steve Jackson
 Photography – Youri Lenquette
 Production – Robert Lévy-Provençal
 Saxophone – David Wilczewski ("Le Baiser...")
 Vocals, pap – Julie Gay ("Le Baiser...")
 Writing, composition – PSY

Charts

References

1990 songs
1991 singles
Ariola Records singles
French-language songs
French pop songs